Croham Hurst School was a day independent school for junior and senior girls located in South Croydon, England. It was established in 1899, and closed in 2008 when it was absorbed into Old Palace School, Croydon.

History

The school was established by Kathleen Ellis in 1899. The second founder, Theodora Clark (of the Clarks shoe manufacturing family) joined Miss Ellis in 1901.

During the Second World War, the school was evacuated to Bridge House, Somerset - where the staff and girls enjoyed the countryside to such an extent that when the Croydon site reopened in 1942 they didn't want to return. However, in 1945 the two schools were reunited on the Croydon site.

Shortly afterwards a Junior School was established, later known as The Limes.

Premises

The principal building of the site (known as the "Main Building") was first occupied in 1907. It housed the Headmistress's office, the Small Hall, various form rooms, and two libraries – the Sixth Form Library, and another dedicated to Elizabeth Wagstaff (a sibling of a former pupil, who lost her life in the Second World War). The Small Hall contained memorials of the school's history, including lists of Headmistresses and Head Girls, a plaque commemorating Kathleen Ellis and Theodora Clark, and a stained-glass window of St. Ursula (created by a former pupil and given to the school in 1948). Rising up the hill from the Main Building was the Garden Wing, built in 1973, which housed an English Room, a Drama Room and a room for Mathematics (two of which were also form rooms). To the left of the Garden Wing was the room for Religious Studies (also a form room); and next to it a path (the "Covered Way") up the hill to the Main Assembly Hall, and later to the Centenary Centre for Design and Technology (constructed to celebrate the School's centenary). To the left of this building were the Science Blocks, mainly constructed in 1969; and beyond them the Doreen Seward Centre, including a Music Room and Gymnasium. To the left of the Doreen Seward Centre was the Sixth Form Centre, originally a house, which was bought in 1957. (It then acquired the name of "The Vineyard", after the parable in the Bible in which Ahab desires Naboth's Vineyard to such an extent that his wife, Jezebel, kills the owner to obtain it – although the school did not go to quite these lengths.) The building was for years was used as the science laboratories. Outside this building was a playing field.

List of Headmistresses

Miss Kathleen Ellis, 1899–1921
Miss Theodora Clark, 1921–1927
Miss Berta Humphrey (later Mrs Berta Bywater), 1927–1951
Miss Florence Ross, 1951–1952
Miss Stella Wickham (later Mrs Stella Chamberlain), 1952–1959
 Miss Molly Ayre, 1959–1970
 Miss Doreen Seward, 1970–1986
 Miss Joan Shelmerdine, 1986–1994
 Miss Sue Budgen, 1994–2005
 Mrs Jane Abbotts, 2005–2008

Absorption into Old Palace School
In September 2007 it was announced that the Whitgift Foundation would be taking over the school from September 2008, and that it was to merge with Old Palace School. From that date, the senior girls and their staff moved to Old Palace School. The senior school at Croham Hurst became the junior school of Old Palace; and The Limes became a nursery. The Main Building of the school has since been refurbished.

Notable former pupils

 Ellinor Hinks (1913–2004), physical educationist.
Sue Perkins (b. 1969), comedian and broadcaster.
Susanna Reid (b. 1970), newsreader.

Notes

References

Sources 

 
 

 

Defunct schools in the London Borough of Croydon
Educational institutions established in 1889
1889 establishments in England
Educational institutions disestablished in 2008
2008 disestablishments in England